SDM College (Autonomous), Ujire was a brainchild of the then Dharmadhikari of Sri Kshethra Dharmasthala, Sri D Ratnavarma Heggade. Established in 1966 at a very small scale at Siddavana Gurukula was affiliated to Mysore University. It is affiliated to the Mangalore university since 1989. The college continued to grow with the introduction of Postgraduate programmes from the academic year 2001. The college attained academic autonomy from the academic year 2007. At present, the college offers 5 undergraduate and 10 postgraduate programmes, as well as PhD programmes affiliated with the universities of Hampi, Tumkur and Mangalore.

Managed by Sri Dharmasthala Manjunatheshwara Educational Society. The College is accorded with autonomous status by the UGC and is one of the five autonomous colleges under Mangalore University.

Facilities
6 AV/seminar halls, multimedia centre, 18 mbps lease line for internet connectivity, WIFI facility, Studio, Indoor and outdoor stadiums, multi gym facilities.

References

 http://www.sdmcujire.in/index.php

Colleges in Karnataka
Universities and colleges in Dakshina Kannada district
1996 establishments in Karnataka
Educational institutions established in 1996
Colleges of Mangalore University